Louis Persinger (11 February 1887, Rochester, Illinois31 December 1966, New York, New York) was an American violinist, pianist and professor of violin.
Persinger had early lessons in Colorado, appearing in public by the age of 12. His main studies were at the Leipzig Conservatory where he studied violin with Hans Becker, piano with Carl Beving, conducting with Arthur Nikisch before finishing with Eugène Ysaÿe in Brussels and then studying with Jacques Thibaud in France for two summers. Arthur Nikisch described him as ‘one of the most talented pupils the Leipzig Conservatory ever had’.

He served as leader of the Berlin Philharmonic orchestra and the Royal Opera Orchestra in Brussels before being appointed leader and assistant conductor of the San Francisco Symphony Orchestra in 1915 and succeeding Leopold Auer at the Juilliard School in New York in 1930.

He was best known as the teacher of great violinists Yehudi Menuhin, Ruggiero Ricci, Isaac Stern, Myriam Solovieff,       Stephan Hero, Camilla Wicks, Almita Vamos, Fredell Lack, Guila Bustabo, Arnold Eidus, Donald Erickson, Zvi Zeitlin, Leonard Posner, Enrique Danowicz and Louise Behrend.  He was also Ricci's piano accompanist for many recitals and recordings, and Menuhin's for his first few recordings.

Quotes
Arthur Nikisch  described him as ‘one of the most talented pupils the Leipzig Conservatory ever had’.

References

Grove's Dictionary
 Hart, Margaret C. "Louis Persinger - A Tribute on his 75th." Juilliard Review (Winter 1961-62), p. 4-8.
 The Art of Violin Playing, Daniel Melsa, Foulsham & Co. Ltd.
 The Book of the Violin, edited by Dominic Gill (1984), Phaidon Press.  
 An Encyclopedia of the Violin, by Alberto Bachmann (1965/1990), Da Capo Press. 
 The Great Violinists, by Margaret Campbell (1980/2004), Robson Books.  
 Paganini-The Genoese, by G.I.C. de Courcy (1957), University of Oklahoma Press
 Stuff Smith-Pure at Heart, edited by Anthony Barnett & Eva Løgager (1991), Allardyce Barnett Publishers. 
 Szigeti on the Violin, by Joseph Szigeti (1969/1979), Dover Publications.  
 Tartini-His Life and Times, by Prof. Dr. Lev Ginsburg (1968), Paganiniana Publications Inc. 
 Unfinished Journey, Yehudi Menuhin (1976), Macdonald and Jane's.  
 The Violin, by Yehudi Menuhin (1996), Flammarion.  
 The Violin and I, by Kato Havas (1968/1975), Bosworth & Co. Ltd.
 Violins & Violinists, by Franz Farga (1950), Rockliff Publishing Corporation Ltd.
 Ysaÿe, by Prof. Dr. Lev Ginsburg (1980), Paganiniana Publications Inc. 

American classical violinists
Male classical violinists
American male violinists
Concertmasters
American classical pianists
Male classical pianists
American male pianists
Juilliard School faculty
1887 births
1966 deaths
20th-century classical pianists
20th-century classical violinists
20th-century American male musicians
20th-century American pianists
20th-century American violinists